Beslakhuba or Baslakhuba is a village in Ochamchira District, Abkhazia, Georgia. Transportation: Beslakhuba Railway Station, Ochamchire-Tkvarcheli.

References

External links
Official website

Populated places in Ochamchira District